The Anglin is a  long river in the Creuse, Indre and Vienne departments in central France. Its source is near Azerables. It flows generally northwest. It is a right tributary of the Gartempe, into which it flows near Angles-sur-l'Anglin.

Its main tributaries are the Salleron, the Abloux and the Benaize.

The Anglin is one of France's few remaining "wild rivers" (rivers which have never been dammed). Anglin Castle is an 11th Century castle located high above the banks of the Anglin in the town of Angles-sur-l'Anglin.

Departments and communes along its course
The following list is ordered from source to mouth : 
Creuse: Azerables
Indre: Mouhet, La Châtre-Langlin, Chaillac, Dunet, Lignac, Chalais, Bélâbre, Mauvières, Saint-Hilaire-sur-Benaize, Concremiers, Ingrandes, Mérigny
Vienne: Saint-Pierre-de-Maillé, Angles-sur-l'Anglin

References

Rivers of Nouvelle-Aquitaine
Rivers of Centre-Val de Loire
Rivers of France
Rivers of Creuse
Rivers of Indre
Rivers of Vienne